Llano Norte is a corregimiento in Coclé Province in the Republic of Panama.

References 

Populated places in Coclé Province